The Thai World Hockey League was an ice hockey league in Thailand.  After 14 years, it was replaced by the Siam Hockey League for the months of November through May.  The TWHL was one of the first leagues that allowed various skill levels to participate.  The Siam Hockey League was formed to try to establish a high level of play.

History 
The Thai World Hockey League was founded by the American Scott Whitcomb and the Canadian Scott Murray in the year 2003, who both were players of the Flying Farangs, a Thailand-based team of foreign ice hockey players who compete in club tournaments around Asia.

For the 2015 season, the organizers decided to take a year off, which became permanent, leading to the formation of the Siam Hockey League, organized by former TWHL players and staff.  There is also a "summer" league run by locals called the Bangkok Ice Hockey League.

The Thai World Hockey League consisted of roughly 50 per cent foreigners and 50 per cent domestic players.

Tournaments organized by the league are the Land of Smiles Classic and the City of Angels Cup. Up to 42 teams from 15 countries worldwide participate in these tournaments every year.

Teams 2011-12 
 BNH Hospital Blades
 Din Daeng Jets
 Pattaya Oilers
 Penalty Spot Slammers

TWHL champions 
 2015: Sport Corner Snipers
 2012: Din Daeng Jets
 2011: BNH Hospital Blades
 2010/11: Pattaya Oilers 
 2009/10: Roadhouse Smokers  
 2008/09: Wall Street Warriors
 2007/08: Curve Intrior Specialist Coyotes 
 2006/07: Curve Contracting Coyotes
 2005/06: Jamcomb Sports Leafs
 2004/05: Curve Contracting Coyotes
 Spring 2004: Office Bar Bruins
 Autumn 2003: Klong Toey Whalers

References

External links
List of Thai champions

Sports leagues in Thailand
Ice hockey in Thailand
Ice hockey leagues in Asia
Sports leagues established in 2003
2003 establishments in Thailand